Keith Allen may refer to:

Keith Allen (actor) (born 1953), British actor
Keith Allen (footballer, born 1943) (born 1943), English professional footballer
Keith Allen (ice hockey) (1923–2014), Canadian hockey player/coach/executive
Keith Allen (politician) (1931–1984), New Zealand MP
Keith Allen (American football) (born 1974), American football coach
Keith Allen (rugby union), Scottish rugby union referee

See also
Keith Allan (disambiguation)
Allen (surname)